Ryang Man-gil (born on April 16, 1941) is a North Korean politician. He served as the Chairman of Pyongyang People's Committee and as a member of the Supreme People's Assembly.

Biography
Then in February 1990 the politician became the chairman of the State Planning Commission. He was a member of the Supreme People's Assembly, the North Korean unicameral parliament, in the 10th and 11th convocations (1998 to 2009).

From March 1993 to May 1994, head of the Commission for Economic Management in North Hwanghae Province. He took up a similar position in February 1996 in the capital of North Korea, Pyongyang. In September 1998, he became chairman of the People's Committee of Pyongyang for the first time. He was without interruption until June 2006, then replaced by Pang Chol-gap (방철갑). Then he became the vice-chairman of the People's Committee in Mundok County, South Pyongan Province.

Between July 2010 and 2012, Ryang Man-gil is the chairman of the Pyongyang People's Committee for the second time replacing Pak Kwan-o (박관오). He also heads the Korean Lao Friendship Society (in this role he replaced Pak Kwan-o in November 2010). During the 3rd Korean Labor Party Conference on September 28, 2010, he sat for the first time in the Central Committee of the Workers' Party of Korea.

After the death of Kim Jong-il in December 2011, Ryang Man-gil was in 107th place in the 232-person Funeral Committee.

References

Workers' Party of Korea politicians
Members of the Supreme People's Assembly
Pyongyang
1941 births
Living people